Stop bath is a acidic solution used for processing black-and-white photographic films, plates, and paper. It is used to neutralize the alkaline developer, thus halting development.

Stop bath is commonly a 2% dilution of acetic acid in water, though a 2.5% solution of potassium or sodium metabisulfite works just as well. Because organic developers only work in alkaline solutions, stop bath halts the development process almost immediately and provides precise control of development time. Neutralizing the alkalinity of basic developers also helps to preserve the strength of the fixer, making it last longer.

Stop bath accounts for the vinegar-like odor of the darkroom. In its concentrated form it can cause chemical burns, but is harmless when diluted to a working solution. Stop bath becomes exhausted when carried over developer causes the solution to become alkaline. For indicator stop baths, which changes color to indicate when the bath is exhausted and no longer effective, a pH indicator dye like bromocresol purple is used. Low-odor stop baths use citric acid or sodium bisulfite in place of acetic acid.

References

Sources

Photographic processes